Giles Land District is a land district (cadastral division) of Western Australia, located within the Eastern and Eucla land divisions on the Nullarbor Plain. It spans roughly 29°00'S - 31°00'S in latitude and 123°30'E - 126°30'E in longitude.

The district was created on 20 October 1916 and was defined in the Government Gazette:

References
 

Land districts of Western Australia
Goldfields-Esperance